Slinn is a surname. Notable people with the surname include:

David Slinn (born 1959), British diplomat
William Slinn (1826–1888), English cricketer

Surnames of European origin